Stadthalle Offenbach is a convention center that opened in 1966 in Offenbach am Main, Germany. It hosts concerts, sporting events, cabaret and variety performances. There are 3,000 seats. Notable past performers include Frank Zappa, Bob Dylan, The Moody Blues, David Bowie, Erasure, Heart, Kiss, Iron Maiden, Pink Floyd, Rammstein, AC/DC, Metallica, Oasis, Weather Report and Jimi Hendrix.

References

External links

 

Buildings and structures in Offenbach am Main
Convention centres in Germany
Music venues completed in 1966